The 2011 GP Ouest-France was the 75th edition of the GP Ouest-France, a single-day cycling race. It was the 23rd event of the 2011 UCI World Tour season.

Grega Bole, the Slovenian road race champion riding for the  team, took the victory after an attack within the final  of the race and managed to hold on to his advantage, as the rest of the field closed on him in the closing metres.

Results

References

External links

2011
2011 UCI World Tour
GP Ouest-France